Heraldic labels are used to differentiate the personal coats of arms of members of the royal family of the United Kingdom from that of the monarch and from each other.  In the Gallo-British heraldic tradition, cadency marks have been available to "difference" the arms of a son from those of his father, and the arms of brothers from each other, and traditionally this was often done when it was considered important for each man to have a distinctive individual coat of arms and/or to differentiate the arms of the head of a house from junior members of the family.  This was especially important in the case of arms of sovereignty: to use the undifferenced arms of a kingdom is to assert a claim to the throne. Therefore, in the English royal family, cadency marks were used from the time of Henry III, typically a label or bordure alluding to the arms of the bearer's mother or wife. After about 1340, when Edward III made a claim to the throne of France, a blue label did not contrast sufficiently with the blue field of the French quarter of the royal arms; accordingly most royal cadets used labels argent: that of the heir apparent was plain, and all others were charged.  Bordures of various tinctures continued to be used into the 15th century.

The label

In the ordinary system of differences a label of three points (which has also been termed a label with three files) is the distinction of the eldest son during the lifetime of his father. In the oldest rolls of arms the labels are all of five points; but labels of three points were at an early period used interchangeably. Besides being used as mere temporary marks of cadency, labels are also employed as permanent distinctions, borne (like any other charge) by every member of some particular branches of certain families. Labels are the principal cadency marks used in certain royal families.  In the British royal family, all labels are argent (white). The sons and daughters of the sovereign all bear labels of three points argent; that of the arms of the Prince of Wales is plain, but all others are charged. Further descendants of princes bear labels of five points charged. All such differences should be borne on the arms, crest, and supporters.

Charges

The system of a special mark for difference for each member of the family goes back to the time of Henry III, whose successor, as a prince, placed such a mark on the shield of England. Since 1340 this label has almost always been white, and overlaid with small figures, or charges, such as red crosses of St George. This red cross represents England and its patron saint, and was first borne by Richard of Bordeaux (future king Richard II) before the death of his father Edward, the Black Prince in 1376. Other charges used:
 A blue anchor, a symbol of hope, or of naval service, as borne by several Dukes of York.
 The Crown of England (sometimes called the Imperial or St Edward's Crown) borne by the abdicated king the Duke of Windsor, which is as unusual as the occurrence itself.
 Roses: the Tudor Rose (combined red and white) has been used as an English royal badge since 1485.
 Red hearts may allude to the arms of Lüneburg (part of the Hanoverian arms) or – for the descendants of Edward VII and Alexandra of Denmark – to the coat of arms of Denmark.
 The blue fleur-de-lis appears amongst the Royal Badges in England of the Stuarts.
 The thistle is an ancient badge of Scotland.
 The escallop shell was traditionally a token of pilgrimage on the Way of St James.  The shell in the labels of the dukes of Cambridge and Sussex alludes to those of the Spencer arms of their mother, Diana, Princess of Wales.
 The bee is a canting charge in the label of Princess Beatrice of York.
 The trefoil is a badge of Ireland, associated with St Patrick, who used it to illustrate the doctrine of the Trinity.

Labels used since the Hanoverian succession

See also
 Royal Supporters of England
 Royal Standards of England

References

British heraldry
United Kingdom
 
British monarchy
United Kingdom
National symbols of the United Kingdom

House of Hanover
House of Windsor
British royal family